Chirle is a village in Uran taluka of Raigarh district, Maharastra.

The under-construction Mumbai Trans Harbour Link will connect Chirle with Sewri, South Mumbai. The proposed Konkan Expressway will connect Chirle with Patradevi near the Maharashtra-Goa border.

References 

Cities and towns in Raigarh district